Femaye  is a rural commune of the Cercle of Djenné in the Mopti Region of Mali. The commune includes 21 villages. The principal village (chef-lieu) is Taga.

Taga is 18 km from Djenné but the route is impassable when the Bani River floods.

References

Communes of Mopti Region